Canna liliiflora is a species of herb in the family Cannaceae. It is native of Peru and Bolivia.

Description
Herb up to 3 m with stout, erect stems. Leaves large, oblong, acuminate. Flowers 10–13 cm. (4-5") long, honeysuckle-scented, borne in a short, terminal raceme; perianth tubular, the three outer petaloid lobes linear-oblong, convolute, reflexed, tinged green, the three inner ones straight and extended, recurved at end, white, tinted yellowish-green.

Cultivation
The species prefers light (sandy), medium (loamy) and heavy (clay) soils and requires well-drained soil. The preferred soil is acid, neutral and basic (alkaline). It cannot grow in the shade and requires moist soil. It is hardy to zone 10 and is frost tender. In the north latitudes it is in flower from August to October, and the seeds ripen in October.

References

 The illustration is from Flore des serres et des jardins de l’Europe by Charles Lemaire and others. Gent, Louis van Houtte, 1855, volume 10 (plate 1055-1056).
 Cooke, Ian, 2001. The Gardener's Guide to Growing cannas, Timber Press. 
 Johnson's Gardeners Dictionary, 1856
 Tanaka, N. 2001. Taxonomic revision of the family Cannaceae in the New World and Asia. Makinoa ser. 2, 1:34–43.

liliiflora
Flora of Peru
Flora of Bolivia
Plants described in 1855